Northgate High School (previously comprising Northgate Grammar School for Boys and Northgate Grammar School for Girls) is a co-educational secondary school situated in north Ipswich, Suffolk, England. It is a co-educational comprehensive school, for ages 11–16, and 16-18 in the Sixth Form Department. It has approximately 1736 children on roll.

, the Headteacher is Rowena Mackie.

The school makes use of the Council-run Northgate Sports Centre, which has an Olympic standard running track.

History
It was previously two schools: Northgate Grammar School for Boys and Northgate Grammar School for Girls. Earlier, it was Ipswich Municipal Secondary School.

Language College
Awarded Language College status in 1999, this was the first Language College designated in Suffolk. This development led to outreach work taking place in both the school's main feeder schools and across other schools in the county.

Academic performance
In its most recent Ofsted inspection in May 2012, the school was graded as "Good" overall, with a number of individual outstanding grades. GCSE results are consistently above the national and regional averages, and at A-Level it gets results similar to a grammar school: the fifth best in Suffolk in 2008.  In 2013, the school was placed in the top 100 state schools in England.

Notable alumni
 Stuart Boardley, footballer
 Gemma Correll, cartoonist
 David Gauke, former Conservative MP for South West Hertfordshire
 Luke Hyam, football manager and former player
 Liam Trotter, League One footballer
 Richard G. Whitman, academic

Northgate Grammar School

 Graham Addicott, TV Producer-Director, IRN Foreign Correspondent, ITV Presenter/Reporter and founder of First Freedom Productions
 Rear-Adm Paul Bass CB, Flag Officer Portsmouth and Port Admiral Portsmouth from 1979-1981
 Michael Blackburn, Chief Executive from 1993-98 of the Halifax Building Society, Chief Executive from 1987–93 of the Leeds Permanent Building Society, and President from 1998-99 of the Chartered Institute of Bankers
 Very Rev Mark Bonney, Dean of Ely since 2012
 Malcolm Brabant, BBC Foreign Correspondent
 Helen Boaden, former Director of BBC News
 David Brighty CMG CVO, Ambassador to Cuba from 1989–91, Czechia and Slovakia from 1991-94, and to Spain (and Andorra) from 1994–98
 Adrian Brown, International orchestra conductor
 Bernard Buckham, Daily Mirror journalist, and Editor from 1918-20 of the Sunday Herald
 Terry Burrows, author/musician
 Brian Cant, long-established former BBC children's television presenter
 John Constable, Headteacher since 2010 of Langley Grammar School, Deputy Head from 2003-09 of Wycombe High School and from 1998-2003 of Sir William Borlase's Grammar School
 James Easter, international speedway team manager from 1984-2000 of ENGLAND:Australia:USA 
 David Edwards, Theatre Directorship
 Sir Cyril English, Director-General from 1968–76 of the City and Guilds of London Institute 
 Dr Edward Glazier CB, Director from 1967-72 of the Royal Radar Establishment 
 Prof Malcolm Guthrie, Professor of Bantu Languages from 1951–70 at the University of London 
 Garry Hart, Baron Hart of Chilton, Chancellor from 2008-14 of the University of Greenwich
 Birkin Haward, architect (designer of West Ham station - with his wife, Joanna van Heyningen)
 Sir Edmund Hirst CBE, Forbes Professor from 1947–68 of Organic Chemistry at the University of Edinburgh, President of the Royal Society of Edinburgh from 1959–64 and President from 1956-8 of the Royal Society of Chemistry; he was the first person to synthesise Vitamin C in 1933.
 Stuart Jarrold, Anglia TV Correspondent
 Nik Kershaw, singer and songwriter
 Jane Lapotaire, actress
 Prof Alan Little, Professor of Social Administration from 1978-86 at Goldsmiths' College
 Geoffrey Lucas, General Secretary from 2000-11 of The Headmasters' and Headmistresses' Conference, Director of the PGCE course from 1980-89 at Trinity and All Souls College, Leeds
 Vice Adm Alan Massey CBE, Chief Executive from 2010-18 of the Maritime and Coastguard Agency, Second Sea Lord from 2008–10, and Commander from 2001-02 of HMS Illustrious, and from 2002-03 of HMS Ark Royal 
 Peter Mornard, Wimbledon referee
 Sir Trevor Nunn CBE, film and theatre director and married to the actress Imogen Stubbs
 Dame Winifred Prentice, President from 1972-76 of the Royal College of Nursing 
 Nigel Roome, Professor from 1993-96 at the Schulich School of Business, from 1996-99 at University of Tilburg, from 1999-2006 at Erasmus University Rotterdam, from 2006-11 at Free University Brussels and from 2010 at the Vlerick Business School and Chair since 2006 of the European Academy of Business and Society
 Frank Salmon, architectural historian
 Peter Sharman CBE, Chief General Manager from 1975-84 for the Norwich Union Insurance Group
 Cecil Studd, England international hockey player
 Sir Frank Willis CBE, General Secretary from 1939-55 of the National Council of YMCAs, who married the daughter of the biochemist Sir Frederick Walker Mott FRS
 Donald Woods FRS, Iveagh Professor of Chemical Microbiology from 1955–64 at the University of Oxford, won the 1953 Marjory Stephenson Prize

References

External links
 School website
 EduBase

Secondary schools in Suffolk
Community schools in Suffolk
Schools in Ipswich